The Darkest Spark is the debut full-length album by Canadian indie pop band The Ghost Is Dancing.   It was released by Sonic Unyon Records on June 19, 2007.

Track listing
All songs written by The Ghost Is Dancing
 "September '01"
 "The Darkest Spark"
 "We'll Make It"
 "Shuttles and Planes"
 "Organ"
 "Greatlakescape"
 "Wall of Snow"
 "The Dark and the Bright"
 "Wait Another Day"
 "Arrivals (Are Never Enough)"

References

2007 albums
The Ghost Is Dancing albums
Sonic Unyon Records albums